The 2011 Honda Grand Prix of St. Petersburg was the first race of the 2011 IZOD IndyCar Series season. The race took place on March 27, on the  temporary street circuit in St. Petersburg, Florida, and was telecast by ABC in the United States.

Report

Background

Dario Franchitti began the season as defending champion of the IndyCar Series, after a season-long battle with Will Power in 2010. It was Franchitti's second championship in the past three seasons. (The year he did not win, 2008, he was racing in NASCAR.) Other contenders for the 2011 championship include Franchitti's Chip Ganassi Racing teammates, Scott Dixon, Charlie Kimball, and Graham Rahal, the Penske Racing drivers, Ryan Briscoe, Hélio Castroneves, and Will Power, among others. Tony Kanaan left Andretti Autosport after the 2010 season and was now piloting the #82 entry for KV Racing Technology – Lotus. Briscoe, Castroneves, Power, and Rahal were all previous winners of the St. Petersburg race.

The race marked the IndyCar debut or return for several drivers, including:
Sébastien Bourdais (Champ Car champion, 2004–07) He would ultimately not start because of his car catching fire after a crash in the final practice.
Oriol Servià (Champ Car driver 2000–2007, IRL in 2008, also ran in the 2009 Indy 500)
Charlie Kimball
J. R. Hildebrand
James Jakes

Race

The first Indycar race to use double-file starts and restarts began anything but smoothly. On turn 1 of lap 1, five cars were involved in contact as the drivers fought for position. Helio Castroneves made contact with Marco Andretti's car, who ran up the back of Scott Dixon's machine and flipped upside down. Mike Conway, racing for the first time since last year's Indianapolis 500, was also caught in the pile-up, along with Briscoe. Castroneves, Briscoe, and Dixon would finish the day running, but had no chance for victory. Andretti Autosport took the brunt of the blow, with two of their drivers, Andretti and Conway, being knocked out of the race as a result. On the ensuing restart (lap 5) Dario Franchitti and Tony Kanaan passed Power to take first and second position respectively.

The yellow flag came out again on lap 7 when E. J. Viso spun off the track, but without making contact, and green flag racing resumed by lap 10. Only two laps later however, the caution came out again for debris on the racetrack, and Sebastián Saavedra spun and stalled on the ensuing restart, bringing out yet another caution. In total, nine of the first 15 laps were run under yellow, leading many drivers and fans to question the new restart system. Will Power briefly regained the lead on lap 71 when Franchitti pitted, but he had to pit himself two laps later, and Franchitti won comfortably by 6.7 seconds. The main point of interest over the final 10 laps was the battle for 3rd place between the veteran Kanaan and second-year driver Simona de Silvestro. Kanaan was able to hold on and gain a podium place for his new team, KV-Lotus, but it was an impressive run by de Silvestro nonetheless.

Classification

Qualifying
 All cars were split into two groups of twelve, with the fastest six from each group going through to the "top 12" session. In this session, the fastest six cars progressed to the "Firestone Fast Six." The fastest driver in the final session claimed pole, with the rest of the cars lining up in session order, regardless of qualifying times. (fast six from 1–6, top 12 from 7–12 and round 1 from 13–24, with group 1 drivers occupying the odd–numbered grid positions, and group 2 drivers occupying the even–numbered grid positions.

Race

Championship standings after the race
Drivers' Championship standings

 Note: Only the top five positions are included.

References

External links 
IndyCar Results Page

Honda Grand Prix of St. Petersburg
Honda Grand Prix of St. Petersburg
March 2011 sports events in the United States
Grand Prix of St. Petersburg
21st century in St. Petersburg, Florida